The Three Brothers is a rock formation, in Yosemite Valley, California. It is located just east of El Capitan and consists of Eagle Peak (the uppermost "brother"), and Middle and Lower Brothers.

The name Three Brothers

Members of the Mariposa Battalion named the Three Brothers after the capture of the three sons of Chief Tenaya near the base of the Three Brothers.

Their original name

The Ahwahnechee name was "Kom-po-pai-zes", or sometimes "Pompomposus", is translated as "mountains with heads like frogs when ready to leap".

John Muir

John Muir considered the view from Eagle Peak to be the most beautiful view of Yosemite Valley available.

References

External links
 

Mountains of Mariposa County, California
Rock formations of Yosemite National Park